Adriatic Sea of Fire is a 1968 French-Yugoslav war drama film directed by Alexandre Astruc. It tells the story of the Yugoslav destroyer Zagreb which fights against Italy in 1941, and how some of the crew members try to organise a mutiny to keep fighting when the commander is ordered to surrender.

Cast
 Gérard Barray as Michel
 Claudine Auger as Mirjana
 Antonio Passalia as Serge
 Raoul Saint-Yves as Dr Baric
 Tatjana Beljakova as Veronica
 Relja Bašić as the captain

References

External links

1960s war drama films
1968 films
French war drama films
Yugoslav war drama films
Films directed by Alexandre Astruc
Films set in 1941
Films set in the Mediterranean Sea
Films set in Yugoslavia
World War II naval films
1968 drama films
War films set in Partisan Yugoslavia
French World War II films
Yugoslav World War II films
1960s French-language films
1960s French films